John Carr (April 9, 1793 – January 20, 1845) was a U.S. Representative from Indiana for three terms from 1831 to 1837, then again for a fourth term from 1839 to 1841.

Biography
Carr was born in Uniontown, Pennsylvania. He moved with his parents to Clark County, Indiana, in 1806. There he attended the public schools.

He joined William Henry Harrison's army during Tecumseh's War and fought in the Battle of Tippecanoe in 1811. He remained in the army and was appointed lieutenant in a company of United States Rangers, authorized by an act of Congress for defense of western frontiers, in the War of 1812. He later became a brigadier general and major general of the Indiana Militia which he served in until his death.

He served as clerk of Clark County from 1824 until 1830. He also served as a presidential elector for Andrew Jackson and John C. Calhoun in 1824.

Congress 
While in the United States House of Representatives he served as chairman of the Committee on Private Land Claims during the 24th Congress. He failed to be reelected in the 1836 election.

Carr was elected as a Democrat to the 26th congress and served from March 4, 1839, until March 3, 1841. He did not seek reelection.

Death
He died in Charlestown, Indiana, January 20, 1845. He was interred in the Old Cemetery.

References

1793 births
1845 deaths
People from Indiana in the War of 1812
Indiana Democratic-Republicans
American militia generals
Jacksonian members of the United States House of Representatives from Indiana
19th-century American politicians
Democratic Party members of the United States House of Representatives from Indiana
People from Jackson County, Indiana
People from Clark County, Indiana
Burials in Indiana